Jamie Kalani English is a former American politician and was a Democratic member of the Hawaii State Senate representing District 7. English served consecutively from 2001 until 2013 in the District 5 and District 6 seats. English resigned his seat on May 1, 2021, months after having been arrested by Federal agents.

English was charged by the United States Attorney's Office for Hawaii with felony honest services fraud on February 8, 2022 in connection with accepting over $18,000 in cash bribes in exchange for opposing cesspool-related bills while he was a member of the Hawaii State Senate. English has pled guilty to the charge, and was sentenced to 40 months in prison.

Early life and education
English earned his BA in Pacific Island studies from Hawaii Loa College, his MA from the University of Hawaii, and attended the John F. Kennedy School of Government. His father is of Jewish descent. He also served on the Maui County Council from 1997 - 2000. English was a member of the 2000 class of the Pacific Century Fellows.

Elections
In 2000, when Democratic Senator Joe Tanaka retired and left the District 5 seat open, English won the three-way September 23, 2000, Democratic primary with 3,967 votes (48.1%), and won the November 5, 2002, general election with 8,300 votes (53.7%) against Republican nominee Allen Shishido.
In 2002, redistricted to District 6, and with Democratic Senator Avery Chumbley retired, English was unopposed for the September 21, 2002, Democratic primary, winning with 4,884 votes, and the November 5, 2002, general election.
In 2004, English was unopposed for the September 18, 2004, Democratic primary, winning with 4,675 votes, and won the three-way November 2, 2004, general election with 12,362 votes (67.0%) against Republican nominee Robb Finberg and Green Party candidate Shaun Stenshol.
In 2008, English was unopposed for the September 20, 2008, Democratic primary, winning with 4,974 votes, and won the November 4, 2008, general election with 14,030 votes (70.7%) against Independent candidate John Blumer-Buell.
In 2012, redistricted to District 7, and with Democratic Senator Gary Hooser running for Lieutenant Governor of Hawaii, English won the August 11, 2012, Democratic primary with 5,456 votes (66.8%), and was unopposed for the November 6, 2012, general election.

References

External links
Official page at the Hawaii State Legislature
Campaign site
 

21st-century American politicians
American people of Jewish descent
Democratic Party Hawaii state senators
Harvard Kennedy School alumni
Living people
People from Paia, Hawaii
Place of birth missing (living people)
University of Hawaiʻi alumni
Year of birth missing (living people)
Hawaii politicians convicted of crimes